SPIE (formerly the Society of Photographic Instrumentation Engineers, later the Society of Photo-Optical Instrumentation Engineers) is an international not-for-profit professional society for optics and photonics technology, founded in 1955. It organizes technical conferences, trade exhibitions, and continuing education programs for researchers and developers in the light-based fields of physics, including: optics, photonics, and imaging engineering.  The society publishes peer-reviewed scientific journals, conference proceedings, monographs, tutorial texts, field guides, and reference volumes in print and online. SPIE is especially well-known for Photonics West, one of the laser and photonics industry's largest combined conferences and tradeshows which is held annually in San Francisco.  SPIE also participates as partners in leading educational initiatives, and in 2020, for example, provided more than $5.8 million in support of optics education and outreach programs around the world.

Former names 
On July 1, 1955 SPIE was founded as the Society of Photographic Instrumentation Engineers in California to specialize in the application of photographic instrumentation. In 1964 the society changed its name to the Society of Photo-Optical Instrumentation Engineers.

In 1977 SPIE moved its headquarters to Bellingham, Washington, and in 1981 the Society began doing business as (DBA) SPIE—The International Society for Optical Engineering to reflect a changing membership. In 2007, the society ended its DBA and is now referred to simply as SPIE, the international society for optics and photonics.

Conferences and exhibitions 

SPIE Conferences and Exhibitions connect optical science and the optics retail  industry. The society is affiliated with over 140 meetings and events each year.

Publications 
The society's first publication, SPIE Newsletter, was launched in 1957. In 1959, the society published its first book, SPIE Photographic Instrumentation Catalog. The newsletter morphed into the society's first journal, now known as Optical Engineering, SPIE's flagship monthly journal. Throughout the years, SPIE has created many publications including journals, magazines, newspapers, websites, and books.

SPIE publishes:
 Twelve scientific online journals (open access materials available)
 SPIE Technical Paper Proceedings (see Proceedings of SPIE)
 At least 25 original technical books per year via SPIE Press

Scientific journals 
All SPIE journals are peer-reviewed.

 Advanced Photonics Co-published by SPIE and Chinese Laser Press, Advanced Photonics is a highly selective, open access, international journal publishing innovative research in all areas of optics and photonics, including fundamental and applied research.
 Journal of Applied Remote Sensing (JARS) is an online-only, quarterly published journal on remote sensing.
 Journal of Astronomical Telescopes, Instruments, and Systems (JATIS) is published quarterly and covers development, testing, and application of telescopes, instrumentation, techniques, and systems for ground- and space-based astronomy.
  Journal of Biomedical Optics (JBO) is published monthly with the latest on optical technology in health care and research.
 Journal of Electronic Imaging (JEI), co-published bi-monthly with the Society for Imaging Science and Technology, publishes papers on electronic imaging science and technology.
 Journal of Medical Imaging (JMI) is published quarterly and covers fundamental and translational research and applications focused on photonics in medical imaging, which continue to yield physical and biomedical advancements in early detection, diagnostics, and therapy of disease as well as in the understanding of normal.
 Journal of Micro/Nanopatterning, Materials, and Metrology (JM3) is published quarterly and focuses on lithographic technologies and the core enabling technologies that address the patterning needs of the electronics industry.
 Journal of Nanophotonics (JNP) is an online-only, quarterly published journal on fabrication and application of nanostructures that generate or manipulate light from the infrared to the ultraviolet regimes.
 Journal of Optical Microsystems (JOM) is published quarterly and contains papers on cutting-edge research of optical and photonic microsystems, from materials and fabrication of micro-optical and photonic components, through assembly and packaging, to systems and applications.
 Journal of Photonics for Energy (JPE) is an e-journal published quarterly that covers fundamental and applied research applications of photonics for renewable energy harvesting, conversion, storage, distribution, monitoring, consumption, and efficient usage.
 Neurophotonics, published quarterly, is at the interface of optics and neuroscience covering advances in optical technology applicable to study of the brain and their impact on the basic and clinical neuroscience applications.
 Optical Engineering (OE) is the flagship monthly journal of the society, with papers on research and development in all areas of optics, photonics, and imaging science and engineering.

SPIE Press 
SPIE Press, the only independent, not-for-profit book publisher specializing in optics and photonics technologies, produces print monographs, handbooks, tutorial texts, and field guides, as well as electronic books and apps for mobile devices. Its origins date back to 1989 with the publication of The New Physical Optics Notebook.

Digital Library 
The SPIE Digital Library publishes online technical papers from SPIE Journals and Conference Proceedings from 1962 to the present, as well as eBooks published by SPIE Press. There are more than 500,000 articles, with more than 18,000 new research papers added annually.

Photonics Focus 
Photonics Focus is the Society's bimonthly membership magazine focused on photonics applications, career development, and the photonics industry. The magazine launched in January 2020 replacing SPIE Professional, which was the Society's quarterly magazine that covered optics industry insights, technology overviews, and career trends. It ran from 2006 through 2019.

SPIE Newsroom 
The SPIE Newsroom is a technical news website launched in March 2006. The SPIE Newsroom covers technical developments in optics and photonics. SPIE Newsroom articles are based around 13 technical communities. The communities are Astronomy, Biomedical Optics & Medical Imaging, Defense & Security, Electronic Imaging & Signal Processing, Illumination & Displays, Lasers & Sources, Micro/Nano Lithography, Nanotechnology, Optical Design & Engineering, Optoelectronics & Communications, Remote Sensing, Sensing & Measurement, Solar & Alternative Energy.

SPIE Open Access 
SPIE started an open access program in January 2013 to promote knowledge  of technology and retail industry developments in optics and photonics. All articles published in SPIE journals for which authors pay voluntary page charges are freely accessible.

Awards
The society issues several awards:

Gold Medal of the Society Award (since 1977)
SPIE Visionary Award (since 2005)
SPIE President's Award (since 1966)
SPIE Directors' Award (since 1963)
A.E. Conrady Award in Optical Engineering (since 1990)
Aden and Marjorie Meinel Technology Achievement Award (since 1979)
Biophotonics Technology Innovator Award (since 2013)
Britton Chance Biomedical Optics Award (since 2012)
Chandra S. Vikram Award in Optical Metrology (since 2009)
Dennis Gabor Award in Diffractive Optics (since 1983)
Diversity Outreach Award (since 2020)
Early Career Achievement Awards (since 2008)
Frits Zernike Award for Microlithography (since 2004)
G.G. Stokes Award in Optical Polarization (since 2004)
George W. Goddard Award in Space and Airborne Optics (since 1961)
Harold E. Edgerton Award (since 1989)
Harrison H. Barrett Award in Medical Imaging (since 2019)
Joseph W. Goodman Book Writing Award (since 2006)
Maria Goeppert-Mayer Award in Photonics (since 2020)
Maria J. Yzuel Educator Award (since 2003)
Mozi Award (since 2018)
Rudolf and Hilda Kingslake Award in Optical Design (since 1974)
Prism Awards for Photonics Innovation (since 2008)
SPIE-Franz Hillenkamp Postdoctoral Fellowship Award (since 2018)

See also 
 American Institute of Physics
 European Photonics Industry Consortium
 IEEE, IEEE Photonics Society, IEEE Communications Society
 International Commission for Optics
 Photo instrumentation
 Optical Society of America
 Society for Imaging Science and Technology

References

External links

 
1955 establishments in California
Bellingham, Washington
Engineering societies based in the United States
Non-profit academic publishers
Optics institutions
Organizations based in Washington (state)
International scientific organizations